João Pedro Pinto Silva, known as João Pedro (born 26 April 2005), is a Portuguese former football player.

Club career
He made his professional debut in the Segunda Liga for Vizela on 10 September 2016 in a game against Braga B.

References

1989 births
People from Vizela
Living people
Portuguese footballers
F.C. Vizela players
Liga Portugal 2 players
Association football defenders
Sportspeople from Braga District